The 2022–23 Saint Louis Billikens men's basketball team represented Saint Louis University during the 2022–23 NCAA Division I men's basketball season. Their head coach was Travis Ford who was in his seventh season at Saint Louis. The team played their home games at Chaifetz Arena as a member of the Atlantic 10 Conference.

Previous season 
The Billikens finished the 2021–22 season 23–12, 12–6 in A-10 Play to finish in fifth place. They defeated La Salle and St. Bonaventure to advance to the semifinals of the A-10 tournament where they lost to Davidson. They received an at-large bid to the National Invitation Tournament where they lost in the first round to Northern Iowa.

Offseason

Departures

Incoming transfers

Recruiting classes

2022 recruiting class

2023 recruiting class

Roster

Schedule and results 

|-
!colspan=12 style=""| Exhibition

|-
!colspan=12 style=""|Non-conference regular season

|-
!colspan=12 style=""| Atlantic 10 regular season

|-
!colspan=12 style=""| A-10 tournament

Source

Rankings

*AP does not release post-NCAA Tournament rankings

References 

Saint Louis
Saint Louis Billikens men's basketball seasons
Saint Louis Billikens men's basketball
Saint Louis Billikens men's basketball